Pana Chand Meghwal  is an Indian politician from the Indian National Congress and former member of the Rajasthan Legislative Assembly. He was elected to represent the Baran-Atru Constituency. He resigned from Rajasthan assembly on 15 August 2022. Miffed over cases of alleged atrocities on dalits, Congress MLA Pana Chand Meghwal sent his resignation to chief minister Ashok Gehlot, saying he does not have the right to stay as an MLA if he cannot protect the rights of his community.

References

Rajasthani politicians
Indian National Congress politicians
Year of birth missing (living people)
Living people
Rajasthan MLAs 2018–2023
Indian National Congress politicians from Rajasthan